Bruce W. Hoffort (born July 30, 1966) is a Canadian retired professional ice hockey goaltender who played in 9 games over parts of two National Hockey League (NHL) seasons with the Philadelphia Flyers, which is the most games played by an NHL goaltender without registering a loss.

He was a member of the Lake Superior State Lakers 1988 NCAA Championship men's ice hockey team.

Awards and honours

References

External links
 

1966 births
Canadian ice hockey goaltenders
Hershey Bears players
Humboldt Broncos players
Ice hockey people from Saskatchewan
Kansas City Blades players
Lake Superior State Lakers men's ice hockey players
Living people
Melville Millionaires players
Sportspeople from North Battleford
Philadelphia Flyers players
San Diego Gulls (IHL) players
Undrafted National Hockey League players
NCAA men's ice hockey national champions
AHCA Division I men's ice hockey All-Americans